Stephen Spring Rice may refer to:

Stephen Spring Rice (1814–1865), Anglo-Irish civil servant and philanthropist 
Stephen Spring Rice (1856–1902), British civil servant